is the lead guitarist for the Japanese rock band The Pillows. As a mixing engineer, Manabe has worked on albums by The Pillows and The Stereo Future. He enjoys reading in his free time and is an enormous fan of Bob Marley. He also has his own signature guitar made by Sago New Material Guitars.

History

Life
Was born in Hokkaido Prefecture on October 2, 1962. Affectionately known as "Pee-chan" because his friends commented that he looked like the cartoon character, Snoopy. Was in a band called PERSIA before joining The Pillows in 1989, then known as "Pisuke". Manabe is influenced by reggae legend Bob Marley, especially with his work in Nine Miles. He has said that he was influenced by reggae and some punk rock.

Bands

Persia
Before starting in the Pillows, Manabe was a member of a rock band named PERSIA, which disbanded some time before The Pillows formed.

The Pillows
The Pillows, Manabe's main and current band. Formed in 1989 on September 16. Has been playing with them since the beginning and is an important part of the group. Aside from playing guitar, he also works on some of the mixing for the albums.

Nine Miles
Nine Miles is a solo project named after the town in which Bob Marley grew up in Jamaica. He is in charge of everything (excluding some track mixing). Plays all instruments that are heard in the albums. Manabe is influenced by reggae legend Bob Marley to build his own unique reggae sound. Manabe's constant use of reverbs, electronic effects, horns, among others are what give him his incredibly unique sound. The arrangement of instruments only adds to the uniqueness.

Discography

Albums
[2001.03.07] Solomonic Polar Bear
[2003.08.06] Return of the Polar Bear
[2008.01.30] Revolution is My Name
[2012.11.14] Rutile

Compilations
[2005.22.02] Go! Delicious Go! (Omnibus Album)

Covers by The Pillows
The single release by The Pillows (Nonfiction) contained a Nine Miles cover. Nonfiction contained a cover of the Nine Miles song HEART IS THERE.

References

External links
nine miles official website
the pillows official website
nine miles official myspace

1962 births
Living people
Musicians from Sapporo
Japanese rock guitarists